The Bradman Museum & International Cricket Hall of Fame is a permanent cultural exhibition dedicated to the game of cricket. It is located in the Australian town of Bowral, New South Wales. The exhibition opened in November 2010 in buildings formerly used by the Bradman Museum, which was devoted to the cricketing career of the Australian batsman Sir Donald Bradman.  The Bradman Museum opened in 1989. The Hall of Fame incorporated all of the former Bradman Museum's holdings.

The International Cricket Hall of Fame is adjacent to Bradman Oval, which was named after him in 1947, and, as the Glebe Oval, was where he played many games in his early years, and where his and his wife's ashes are now scattered.  The oval and museum are tourist attractions for cricket fans in Australia, and for people visiting from overseas. In 2016, after the ODI win over India in Manuka Oval, Canberra, on their way to Sydney Cricket Ground, the squad became the first Australian squad to ever visit the Museum.

References

External links
 International Cricket Hall of Fame website

Sports museums in Australia
Cricket museums and halls of fame
Don Bradman
Museums established in 2010
Museums in New South Wales
Halls of fame in Australia